Glyceollins are a family of prenylated pterocarpans found in ineffective types of nodule in soybean in response to symbiotic infection.  

It possesses two chiral centers and can be asymmetrically synthesized chemically at a gram level scale. 

Molecules found in the family are :
 Glyceollin I
 Glyceollin II
 Glyceollin III
 Glyceollin IV

Effects
They are phytoalexins with an antiestrogenic activity. Lygin et al. 2013 finds antifungal activity against Phytophthora sojae and Macrophomina phaseolina, and Kim et al. 2010 against Aspergillus sojae. Kaplan et al. 1980 finds nematicidal activity against Meloidogyne incognita. Parniske et al. 1991 finds an antibacterial effect. Glyceollin is a vital part of soybean immunity.

Metabolism
Lygin et al. 2013 find that daidzein is a precursor. Glyceollin is a product of the phenylpropanoid pathway. Glycinol is the direct precursor of glyceollins through the action of a prenyltransferase. Glyceollin synthase then transforms those prenylated precursors into glyceollins.

Inhibitors
Some pathogens produce inhibitors. Ziegler & Pontzen 1982 find Phytophthora megasperma produces an extracellular invertase, a mannanglycoprotein (a glycoprotein of mannan), which prevents glyceollin accumulation not by its enzymatic action but due to an effect of its carbohydrate moiety.

References

Antiestrogens
Pterocarpans